USS Tatoosh (YAG-1) was a wooden-hulled cargo-passenger vessel, SS Catherine D., that was acquired by the U.S. Navy.

SS Catherine D., a wooden-hulled steamship built in 1918 at Bellingham, Washington, by Pacific American Fisheries, Inc., was purchased by the Navy on 27 March 1941; renamed Tatoosh (YAG-1) on 10 April 1941; placed in reduced commission on 25 April 1941; was converted to a mobile section base by the Puget Sound Navy Yard; and placed in full commission on 17 June 1941.

World War II service 
Tatoosh was assigned to the 13th Naval District. Though records of her actual locations do not appear to exist, Tatoosh may well have been assigned to Alaskan waters soon after her commissioning. At any rate, she was reassigned to the 17th Naval District on 15 April 1944, the day upon which the Alaskan part of the 13th Naval District was officially reconstituted as the 17th Naval District. The ship served in the new naval district for the remainder of her career.

Decommissioning and fate 
A survey board inspected the vessel in August 1944, and she was decommissioned on 1 December 1944. Her name was struck from the Navy list on 11 December 1944, and her hulk was destroyed on 29 September 1945.

References

External links 
 
 Pacific American Fisheries (Bellingham, WA)

Ships built in Bellingham, Washington
1918 ships
Ships of the Aleutian Islands campaign